Hi-Tech South station is a Metro station of Shenzhen Metro Line 9. It opened on 8 December 2019.

Station layout

Exits

References

External links
 Shenzhen Metro Hi-Tech South station (Chinese)
 Shenzhen Metro Hi-Tech South station (English)

Shenzhen Metro stations
Railway stations in Guangdong
Nanshan District, Shenzhen
Railway stations in China opened in 2019